Chanda Prescod-Weinstein (born ) is an American theoretical cosmologist and particle physicist at the University of New Hampshire. She is also an advocate of increasing diversity in science.

Early life and education 
Prescod-Weinstein was born in El Sereno in East Los Angeles, California, and went to school in the Los Angeles Unified School District. She is of Barbadian descent on her mother's side and Russian-Jewish and Ukrainian-Jewish descent on her father's side. She earned a Bachelor of Arts degree in Physics and Astronomy at Harvard College in 2003. Her thesis, "A study of winds in active galactic nuclei", was completed under the supervision of Martin Elvis. She then earned a master's degree in astronomy in 2005 at the University of California, Santa Cruz, working with Anthony Aguirre. In 2006, Prescod-Weinstein changed research directions and ultimately moved to the Perimeter Institute for Theoretical Physics to work with Lee Smolin. In 2010, Prescod-Weinstein completed her doctoral dissertation, titled "Cosmic acceleration as Quantum Gravity Phenomenology", under the supervision of Lee Smolin and Niayesh Afshordi at the University of Waterloo, while conducting her research at the Perimeter Institute.

Research 
Prescod-Weinstein's research has focused on various topics in cosmology and theoretical physics, including the axion as a dark matter candidate, inflation, and classical and quantum fields in the early universe.

From 2004 to 2007, she was a named National Science Foundation Graduate Research Fellow.

After earning her Ph.D., she became a NASA Postdoctoral Fellow in the Observational Cosmology Lab at Goddard Space Flight Center.  In 2011, she won a Dr. Martin Luther King Jr. Postdoctoral Fellowship at the Massachusetts Institute of Technology, where she was jointly appointed to the Kavli Institute for Astrophysics and Space Research and the department of physics. At MIT, Prescod-Weinstein worked in Alan Guth's group in the Center for Theoretical Physics.

In 2016, she became the principal investigator on a $100,522 FQXI grant to study “Epistemological Schemata of Astro | Physics: A Reconstruction of Observers” seeking to answer questions regarding how to re-frame who is an "observer", to acknowledge those existing outside of the European Enlightenment framework, and how that might change knowledge production in science.

She is working on the NASA STROBE-X experiment.

Awards 
Prescod-Weinstein earned the Barbados House Canada Inc. Gordon C Bynoe Scholarship in 2007. In 2013 she won the MIT "Infinite Kilometer Award". In March 2017, Prescod-Weinstein won the LGBT+ Physicists Acknowledgement of Excellence Award "For Years of Dedicated Effort in Changing Physics Culture to be More Inclusive and Understanding Toward All Marginalised Peoples".

She was recognized by Essence Magazine as one of 15 Black Women Who are Paving the Way in STEM and Breaking Barriers. Prescod-Weinstein's personal story and ideas have been featured in several venues, including Huffington Post, Gizmodo, Nylon, and the African-American Intellectual History Society. She was named to Nature's list of "ten people who helped shape science in 2020" in January 2021, as well as one of VICE Motherboard's "Humans2020," "honoring scientists, engineers, and visionaries who are changing the world for the better."

She received the 2021 Edward A. Bouchet Award from the American Physical Society, in recognition "For contributions to theoretical cosmology and particle physics, ranging from axion physics to models of inflation to alternative models of dark energy, for tireless efforts in increasing inclusivity in physics, and for co-creating the Particles for Justice movement."

Her 2021 work The Disordered Cosmos: A Journey into Dark Matter, Spacetime, and Dreams Deferred won the Los Angeles Times Book Prize in the Science & Technology category.

She has given several interviews and public talks about her work.

Activism 
Prescod-Weinstein is an advocate for increasing the diversity within science by considering intersectionality and proper celebration of  the underrepresented groups who contribute to scientific knowledge production. She has been a member of the executive committee of the National Society of Black Physicists. In 2017 she was a plenary speaker at the Women in Physics Canada meeting.

Prescod-Weinstein has contributed popular science articles for Scientific American, Slate, American Scientist, Nature Astronomy, Bitch media, and Physics World. She is on the Book Review Board of Physics Today and was editor-in-chief of The Offing.  The American Physical Society described her as a "vocal presence on Twitter". Prescod-Weinstein maintains a Decolonising Science Reading List. She is a monthly contributor to New Scientist, with a column titled "Field Notes from Space-time," and a contributing columnist for Physics World. She was a founding member of the American Astronomical Society Committee for Sexual Orientation and Gender Minorities in Astronomy. Prescod-Weinstein has in the past also been a member of the Jewish Voice for Peace Academic Advisory council.

In October 2018, Prescod-Weinstein was one of 18 authors of a public letter titled "High Energy Physics Community Statement" hosted on a website called "Particles for Justice." The statement condemned Alessandro Strumia's controversial claim at CERN's first Workshop on High Energy Theory and Gender that male scientists were victims of discrimination. Within a day of publication, nearly 1,600 academics had signed the letter in support. As of October 13, it had received nearly 4,000 signatures, including those of  John Ellis, Howard Georgi and David Gross.

In June 2020, in the wake of the murder of George Floyd, Prescod-Weinstein, Brian Nord, and the Particles for Justice group organized a global "Strike for Black Lives". Prescod-Weinstein authored a note on the Particles for Justice page titled "What I wanted when I called for a Strike for Black Lives". On June 10, the day of the strike, over 4,500 academics pledged participation in the strike. Additionally, numerous organizations including Nature, the American Physical Society, the American Association for the Advancement of Science, and the American Institute of Physics supported and/or participated in the strike.

In March 2021, along with Nord, Lucianne Walkowicz, and Sarah Tuttle, Prescod-Weinstein co-authored an opinion piece in Scientific American calling for the James Webb Space Telescope to be renamed because Webb's “legacy is at best complicated and at worst reflects complicity in homophobic discrimination in the federal government.” The opinion piece cited Webb’s promotion of psychological warfare as a cold war tool, as well as citing archival evidence indicating that Webb was a supervisor to State Department staff enforcing the Truman Administration’s policy of purging LGBT individuals from the workplace, and had also directly participated in meetings with U.S. Senators during which he personally handed over a homophobic memorandum written to Webb by one of his subordinates. The opinion piece further notes that when Webb was appointed NASA administrator in 1961, the practice of purging LGBT employees from agencies had become federal policy, and the co-authors argued that as someone in management, Webb bore responsibility for policies enacted under his leadership. Prescod-Weinstein, Walkowicz, Nord, and Tuttle also started a petition, signed by more than 1,700 people, a majority of the signatories astronomers or those in related fields. These activities by the co-authors were part of a larger movement to rename the James Webb Space Telescope, including by the JustSpace Alliance, which produced a documentary on the issue. In November 2022, NASA's chief historian Brian Odom released a report that confirmed archival evidence that then-Deputy Secretary of State Webb had in fact met with U.S. Senators and personally handed over a memo, written to Webb by a subordinate, that denigrated homosexual employees and identified them as security risks. In response, Prescod-Weinstein, Nord, Tuttle, and Walkowicz stated that the questions Odom sought to answer in his report did not answer the one posed by the co-authors in their Scientific American opinion piece as to whether Webb, as a senior government official, was responsible for the activities of the agency that he led. In December 2022, the New York Times published an article by Michael Powell suggesting that Prescod-Weinstein employed false ad hominem attacks in an attempt to discredit Hakeem Oluseyi, a vocal defender of the naming of the James Webb Space Telescope. Prescod-Weinstein has stated that Powell’s claim of her attacks on Oluseyi was never fact-checked and that, to date, neither Powell nor the New York Times has proven this claim. Prescod-Weinstein has also expressed that Powell’s article clearly has a point of view, one that he had settled on prior to interviewing her; this experience as to Powell’s strong point of view was also expressed by Scientific American editor-in-chief Laura Helmuth. Nord, Tuttle, and Walkowicz also publicly criticized the New York Times lack of fact-checking and Powell for his attempt to reframe the broader movement to rename the James Webb Space Telescope as a personal disagreement between two individuals.

Prescod-Weinstein worked with two research assistants for two years to form a database of all professional publications by Black women with PhDs in physics-related disciplines, which was released in December 2022. She said she drew inspiration from the Cite Black Women movement on social media.

Personal life 
Prescod-Weinstein is queer and agender. Her husband is a lawyer. Her mother Margaret Prescod emigrated from Barbados as a teenager, and in New York was a founder of International Black Women for Wages for Housework in 1974. Prescod-Weinstein is the grandchild of feminist Selma James and the step-granddaughter of Trinidadian Marxist writer and historian C. L. R. James.

References

External links

Oral history interview transcript with Chanda Prescod-Weinstein on 10 November 2020, American Institute of Physics, Niels Bohr Library & Archives

21st-century African-American people
21st-century American Jews
21st-century LGBT people
Activists for African-American civil rights
African-American Jews
African-American physicists
African-American scientists
American astronomers
American astrophysicists
American cosmologists
American people of Barbadian descent
American people of Russian-Jewish descent
American people of Ukrainian-Jewish descent
American science writers
Harvard University alumni
Jewish American scientists
Jewish scientists
LGBT academics
LGBT African Americans
LGBT Jews
LGBT people from California
American LGBT scientists
Living people
Members of the National Society of Black Physicists
MIT Center for Theoretical Physics alumni
Queer writers
Science writers
Theoretical physicists
University of California, Santa Cruz alumni
University of New Hampshire faculty
Writers from Los Angeles
Year of birth missing (living people)
Afrofuturist writers
Non-binary scientists
American non-binary writers
Agender people